Chrysotoxum bicinctum is a species of hoverfly.

Description
This species can be distinguished by the contrasting drawings and by the relatively narrow body shape. Thorax is glossy black with two gray longitudinal stripes. Body is relatively slim, the abdomen is long, oval and black with two light yellow bands (hence the Latin species name bicinctum). As in others Chrysotoxum species antennae are relatively long. They are dark, forward pointing and longer than the head. The head is large and wide and the face is yellow and almost flat. The legs are mainly yellow. The wings are transparent, with a large, dark brown spot near the wing tip. 
 

The larvae are thought to feed on ant-attended root aphids. The adult flies can be found from May to September but they are commonest from mid-June to August. They visit a wide range of flowers.

Distribution
Fennoscandia south to Iberia and the Mediterranean basin, through Central Europe and Southern Europe (Italy, the Balkans, Bulgaria) East into Turkey and European Russia then to central Siberia. It is widespread throughout Britain and Europe but normally encountered in small numbers.

Habitat
Adults are usually found on the edges of woodland or scrub or along hedgerows.

Bibliography
 Speight, M.C.D., Castella, E., Sarthou, J.-P. & Monteil, C. (eds.): Syrph the Net on CD, Issue 7. The database of European Syrphidae. . Syrph the Net Publications, Dublin.
 van Veen, M.P. Hoverflies of Northwest Europe KNNV Publishing 2004, .
 Systema Dipterorum. Pape T. & Thompson F.C. (eds)
 Fauna Europaea

References

External links
Biolib
 Tom Gittings Chrysotoxum bicinctum

Diptera of Europe
Syrphinae
Flies described in 1758
Articles containing video clips
Taxa named by Carl Linnaeus